"Son of David" is a song performed by American contemporary worship musician Ryan Ellis featuring Brandon Lake. It was released as the seventh track on Ellis' third studio album, Ryan Ellis, on July 15, 2022. Ellis co-wrote the song with Brandon Lake, Joshua Silverberg, and Tedd Tjornhom. Tedd Tjornhom and Joshua Silverberg produced the song.

"Son of David" peaked at No. 18 on the US Hot Christian Songs chart.

Composition

Critical reception
Katie Clinebell of Air1 said the song "infuses the rocking sound that it creates with a unique sense of purpose and drive, evoking a feeling of perseverance and strength. This song provides a worship anthem for when you need to push through a difficult situation and lean on God's mercy to get through it."

Commercial performance
"‎Son of David" made its debut at number 46 on the US Christian Airplay chart dated November 12, 2022.

"‎Son of David" debuted at number 49 on the US Hot Christian Songs chart dated December 10, 2022,

Music video
Ryan Ellis released the official lyric video of "Son of David" featuring Brandon Lake through his YouTube channel on July 15, 2022.

Charts

References

External links
 

2022 songs
Brandon Lake songs
Songs written by Brandon Lake